George Ellwanger (December 2, 1816 – November 26, 1906) was an American horticulture scientist.

Early life 
Ellwanger was born in Württemberg, Germany, and emigrated to the United States.

Career 
After settling in Rochester, New York, Ellwanger joined with Patrick Barry to form the Mount Hope Nursery (also known as the Ellwanger and Barry Nursery) in 1840. He also became an American citizen in 1840. In 1843, the nursery began publishing catalogs to increase sales.

Ellwanger and Barry entered the real estate business in 1856. Between 1872 and 1913, the firm developed the area now known as Linden-South Historic District on the oldest part of the nursery. The district was listed on the National Register of Historic Places in 2009.

Ellwanger and Barry donated part of their property to the City of Rochester to form Highland Park. Their efforts helped change Rochester from the "Flour City" to the "Flower City".

Personal life 
Ellwanger died in 1906 and is buried across the street from his former nursery in Mount Hope Cemetery. The Ellwanger family monument was designed there by famous Italian artist Nicola Cantalamessa Papotti.

References

External links
Ellwanger and Barry at University of Rochester library
George Ellwanger and Patrick Barry at University of Rochester Flower City History
Ellwanger Garden at Landmark Society

1816 births
1906 deaths
American horticulture businesspeople
Burials at Mount Hope Cemetery (Rochester)
German emigrants to the United States
Scientists from Rochester, New York
19th-century American businesspeople